was a Japanese rock band formed in 1972. Its name is a parody of the late 60s band Plastic Ono Band. Produced by Masatoshi Hashiba on Toshiba-EMI Records (now EMI Music Japan), the band was led by guitarist Kazuhiko Katō and singer , who were a married couple at the time. The word "sadistic" is reported to be inspired by Mika's sadistic way of using knives in the kitchen (and their sense of humour).

In 2003, HMV Japan ranked the band at No. 94 on their list of the "Top 100 Japanese Pops Artists". In September 2007, Rolling Stone Japan rated their 1974 album Black Ship at No. 9 on its list of the "100 Greatest Japanese Rock Albums of All Time".

History 
Kazuhiko Katō moved to Kensington, London in 1972 and, impressed by the burgeoning glam rock scene led by T. Rex and David Bowie, he set about forming a new group in Japan to emulate the style. The original lineup of the band included Katō, Mika, drummer Hiro Tsunoda and lead guitarist Masayoshi Takanaka. This lineup recorded the single "Cycling Boogie" on June 21 1972, released on Doughnut Records, Japan's first private label that was founded by Katō. Subsequently Tsunoda left the band, to be replaced by Yukihiro Takahashi, and bassist Ray Ohara joined the band. This lineup completed the band's self-titled debut album, which was released on the Harvest label in the United Kingdom.

Katō passed the album to Malcolm McLaren who at the time had a shop with Vivienne Westwood, and McLaren passed it on to Bryan Ferry, whose band Roxy Music Sadistic Mika Band would later support on the European leg of their 1975-76 Siren Tour.

Their second album   was recorded in England, produced by Chris Thomas. Thomas also introduced Mika to Badfinger while he produced their 1974 LP Wish You Were Here. Her vocals can be heard on the track "Know One Knows" (translating Pete Ham's lyrics to Japanese). Keyboardist Yu Imai, who had worked as a supporting musician on the first album was promoted to full member status. The album sold well in Japan. In the UK; however, the album sold poorly but received high praise from critics.

Ohara left the band, and was replaced by Tsugutoshi Gotō. Chris Thomas also produced their third album Hot! Menu. The album, which featured tracks such as "Mada Mada Samba", is now quite rare although it was featured on BBC Radio 3's Sounds Interesting. The band played live on BBC TV's Old Grey Whistle Test in October 1975, performing two tracks: "Time to Noodle" and "Suki Suki Suki". When they appeared, a stagehand arranged for the name of the programme (usually shown hung from the back wall) to be spelt as The Old Gley Whistle Test as a nod to the Japanese pronunciation of the letters L and R.

The band also made an appearance on BBC TV's Pebble Mill at One and were interviewed by Jan Leeming. Photographs from this appearance were published in the book S/M/B/2 (2006, Shinko Music) by Masayoshi Sukita, who was a close friend of the band.

The band played live in the United Kingdom supporting Roxy Music including a show at Wembley Stadium. It was the first ever UK tour by a Japanese rock band. Recordings from these concerts were released as their Live in London album. After this album was released, Kazuhiko Katō and Mika divorced, and both left the band. Mika later married Chris Thomas and moved to the UK, where she worked as a food researcher.

The Sadistics 
The remaining members – Takahashi, Takanaka, Imai, and Gotō –  continued for several years as The Sadistics. They released two studio albums and two live albums before the band eventually petered out in 1979 as the members became busy with their solo careers and other projects, such as the Yellow Magic Orchestra and Imitation. All members continued to work with Kazuhiko Katō on his solo albums in the 1970s and '80s.

Post-disbandment 
Kazuhiko Katō became a radio show presenter and a television personality in Japan. He had a successful solo career after the Sadistic Mika Band broke up; pursuing a ska direction before acquiring interest in European experimental music. Most of his solo work employed the talents of the other former Sadistic Mika Band members and other notable guest artists such as Ryuichi Sakamoto, Haruomi Hosono and Akiko Yano. He released two acoustic albums with Kōnosuke Sakazaki of The Alfee under the name Kazukoh in 2007 (Golden Hits) and 2009 (Happy End), and found time to form a new band called Vitamin-Q in 2008, releasing one album (VITAMIN-Q feat ANZA). Katō committed suicide by hanging on October 17, 2009 in the Kitasaku District of Karuizawa in Nagano Prefecture, Japan.

Band producer Masatoshi Hashiba also produced the popular band Vodka Collins.

Drummer Yukihiro Takahashi went on to become part of the synthpop trio Yellow Magic Orchestra (YMO), in which he provided the majority of lead vocals. In the early 2000s, he formed the duo Sketch Show with his ex-YMO bandmate Haruomi Hosono; with Ryuichi Sakamoto becoming regularly involved, the YMO name was later resurrected. In 2014, Takahashi formed the supergroup Metafive, which continues to the present. He has also acted in a number of films and TV shows, usually in comedic roles. Ray Ohara was a regular member of Takahashi's band in the 1980s and 1990s.

Mika released a self-produced album in 1994, where she wrote all songs and lyrics.

Tsugutoshi Gotō has released a large number of albums both solo, and as a member of various bands.

Yu Imai went on to form the group Imitation and collaborated with members of Sandii & the Sunsetz and Talking Heads.  He was also the chief musical collaborator with lyricist Chris Mosdell on three of his solo albums, Equasian (also with Kazuhiko Katō), The Oracles of Distraction, and Fingerprints of the Gods –  the latter being the sonic setting of the Graham Hancock book of the same title.

Masayoshi Takanaka went on to become one of the most famous guitarists in Japan. He has been releasing studio albums and touring to this day.

Reunions 
The band has reunited three times. Each time Kazuhiko Katō, Yukihiro Takahashi and Masayoshi Takanaka have formed the core of the band, with a different female lead vocalist and supporting musicians.

In 1985, the band reunited as the Sadistic Yuming Band. Tsugutoshi Gotō returned on bass. In addition, Ryuichi Sakamoto played keyboards and Yumi Matsutoya, AKA Yuming, sang the female lead vocals.

In 1989, the band reunited as the Sadistic Mica Band with Ray Ohara on bass instead of Gotō, and Karen Kirishima on vocals. Appare, an album featuring new material, was released, as well as the accompanying live album Seiten.

In 2006, the band reunited and became the Sadistic Mikaela Band, with 22-year-old pop singer Kaela Kimura on lead vocals. The lineup released the album Narkissos, featuring a track by renowned English lyricist Chris Mosdell, which sold 92,568 copies and ranked number 147 in the yearly best selling chart. The group also completed a national tour culminating in a show at NHK Hall in Shibuya, Tokyo.

In 2007, the band released a 3-disc live retrospective including material from 1975 and 2006, plus video clips.

References

External Links
 

Japanese jazz ensembles
Japanese hard rock musical groups
Glam rock groups
Musical groups from Osaka
Musical groups established in 1972
Musical groups disestablished in 1979
Musical groups reestablished in 1985
Musical groups reestablished in 1989
Musical groups reestablished in 2006
Musical groups disestablished in 2007
Harvest Records artists
1972 establishments in Japan
2007 disestablishments in Japan